Lacey Spring is an unincorporated community located in Rockingham County, in the U.S. state of Virginia. It is located south of Timberville, just south of Mauzy along Route 11, parallel to Interstate 81.

References

Unincorporated communities in Rockingham County, Virginia
Unincorporated communities in Virginia